Millbrook Township is a township in Graham County, Kansas, USA.  As of the 2000 census, its population was 150.

Geography
According to the USGS, it contains two cemeteries: Brush Creek and Penokee.

The streams of Brush Creek and Jackson Branch run through this township.

References
 USGS Geographic Names Information System (GNIS)

External links
 US-Counties.com
 City-Data.com

Townships in Graham County, Kansas
Townships in Kansas